Sthenopis roseus is a species of moth of the family Hepialidae. It was described by Oberthür in 1912, and is known from China, including Hubei.

References

External links
Hepialidae genera

Moths described in 1912
Hepialidae